Hvidkilde is an estate located in Egense Parish in Svendborg Municipality,  Denmark.   It is situated in the south of the island of Funen.

History
The earliest reference is from 1480 when it was owned by Claus Rønnow.
The main building was built in 1550 and extended in 1742 by Philip de Lange (1704 – 1766).  
Poul Abraham Lehn, Baron of Lehn (1732 – 1804) acquired the estate in 1760.
From 1780, Hvidkilde was the headquarters of the  feudal baron of the Barony of Lehn . The main building was surveyed in 1907 under the direction of architect Anton Rosen (1859 – 1928)  and was restored in 1919.
The present building consists of three wings around a courtyard.

References

External links
Hvidkilde Gods website

Castles and manor houses on Funen
Listed buildings and structures in Svendborg Municipality